Lay Gayint is a woreda in the Amhara Region of Ethiopia. Part of the Debub Gondar Zone, Lay Gayint is bordered on the south by Tach Gayint and Simada, on the southwest by Misraq Este, on the west by Farta, on the north by Ebenat, and on the east by the Semien Wollo Zone. The administrative center is Nefas Mewcha; other towns in Lay Guyint include Gobgob and Sali.

The writer Thomas Pakenham was the first non-Ethiopian to visit this church in 1955.

Notable figures
Notable figures from this small town include Ambachew Mekonnen who served as the President of the Amhara regional state up until his murder during an attempted coup.

Demographics
Based on the 2007 national census conducted by the Central Statistical Agency of Ethiopia (CSA), this woreda has a total population of 206,499, an increase of 23.56% over the 1994 census, of whom 104,401 are men and 102,098 women; 22,825 or 11.05% are urban inhabitants. A total of 46,038 households were counted in this woreda, resulting in an average of 4.49 persons to a household, and 44,494 housing units. The majority of the inhabitants practiced Ethiopian Orthodox Christianity, with 97.47% reporting that as their religion, while 2.47% of the population said they were Muslim.

The 1994 national census reported a total population for this woreda of 167,122 in 33,681 households, of whom 84,585 were men and 82,537 were women; 13,583 or 8.13% of its population were urban dwellers. The largest ethnic group reported in Lay Guyint was the Amhara (99.88%). Amharic was spoken as a first language by 99.84%. The majority 97.6% of the population practiced Ethiopian Orthodox Christianity with 97.6% professing that belief, while 2.27% of the population said they were Muslim.

Notes

Districts of Amhara Region